Armand Frappier  (November 26, 1904 – December 17, 1991) was a physician,  microbiologist, and expert on tuberculosis from Quebec, Canada.

Born in Salaberry-de-Valleyfield, Quebec, the son of Arthur-Alexis Frappier and Bernadette Codebecq, his mother died in 1923 from tuberculosis. This greatly affected him and he pursued a career devoted to fighting this tueuse de maman (mother killer). In 1924, he received a Bachelor of Arts and, in 1930, he received a medical degree from the Université de Montréal. In 1933, he obtained a Bachelor of Science also from the Université de Montréal.

In 1938, he founded the Institut de microbiologie et d'hygiène de Montréal - following the model of the Pasteur Institute in Paris and the Connaught Laboratories of the University of Toronto (Malissard, 1998; 1999a, 1999b, 2000)- the first French-language school of hygiene in the world, and served as its director for 38 years. It was renamed Institut Armand-Frappier in 1975.

He was instrumental in the fight against tuberculosis in Canada and as one of the first researchers to confirm the safety and usefulness of the Bacillus Calmette-Guérin vaccine.

In 1929, he married Thérèse Ostiguy. They had four children: Lise, Monique, Michèle, and Paul.

Honours
 He was named Officer of the Order of the British Empire by King George VI, upon the recommendation of the Canadian government.
 In 1969, he was made a Companion of the Order of Canada.
 In 1985, he was made a Grand Officer of the National Order of Quebec.
 In 1993, the Quebec government created the Prix Armand-Frappier in his honour, given every year to a scientist in recognition of his or her career.
 He was a Fellow of the Royal Society of Canada
 On January 17, 2000, Canada Post honoured him with a stamp entitled, Armand Frappier: Champion Disease Fighter.
 In 2012, he was inducted into the Canadian Medical Hall of Fame.

References

 Malissard, P. (1998), « La longue controverse de la vaccination antituberculeuse au Canada : le Bacille Calmette Guérin (bcg), 1925-1975 », Canadian Bulletin of the History of Medicine/Bulletin canadien d'histoire de la médecine, vol. 15, p. 85-126.
 Malissard, P. (1999a), « Les centres universitaires de production et de recherche en microbiologie au Canada ou savoir se rendre utile», Bulletin d'histoire politique, vol. 7, no 3, p. 40-50.
 Malissard, P. (1999b), Quand les universitaires se font entrepreneurs. Les Laboratoires Connaught et l'Institut de microbiologie et d'hygiène de l'Université de Montréal, 1914-1972, thèse de doctorat, Université du Québec à Montréal.
 Malissard, P.  (2000), « Les "Start-Up" de jadis : la production de vaccins au Canada » Sociologie et sociétés, vol. 32, n° 1, p. 93-106.

External links

Canadian microbiologists
Companions of the Order of Canada
Fellows of the Royal Society of Canada
Grand Officers of the National Order of Quebec
Canadian Officers of the Order of the British Empire
People from Salaberry-de-Valleyfield
Academics in Quebec
1904 births
1991 deaths
Université de Montréal alumni
20th-century Canadian biologists